Dar is a super-yacht built in 2018 at the Dutch shipyard Oceanco. The interior design of Dar was done by Italian studio Nuvolari Lenard and the exterior work was done by Miami-based designer Luiz DeBasto. She is powered by twin 4,828hp MTU 20V4000 M73L engines.

Design 
The materials of the hull is steel, while the superstructure is made out of aluminium with teak laid decks. The yacht is classed by Lloyd's Register and registered in the Cayman Islands.

See also 
 Motor yacht
 List of motor yachts by length
 List of yachts built by Oceanco
 Oceanco

References 

2018 ships
Motor yachts
Ships built in the Netherlands